The  series is the collection of video games made by an amateur game developer known as SmokingWOLF. Using RPG Tsukūru programs and Simulation RPG Tsukūru 95, SmokingWOLF so far has created and published several noted freeware and shareware games as well as upcoming games created with Wolf RPG Editor, a game engine which he himself programmed.

When using this term, it usually suggests his widely known accomplishments, namely Silfade Kembunroku, Silfade Gensōtan, and Silhouette Note. Also it might extensively include his other minor and incomplete projects such like .

Silfade Kembunroku

 is a graphical adventure game made with RPG Tsukūru 2000. Set in a fictional world named Silfade, the game's story humorously depicts life of fifteen-year-old Eshutā (エシュター), a student of the Nōma Academy (ノーマ学院). When prompted, the player determines Eshutā's action from Look (見る), Talk/Listen (話す・聞く), Examine (調べる), or Relocate (移動) via on-screen menus. Player leads Eshutā through said on-screen menus to fulfill objectives given in each segment of the story. Cutscenes are often inserted during exploration. There is also an RPG-like combat in the game, in which Eshutā fights against enemies in a turn-based fashion akin to the Final Fantasy’s Active Time Battle.

Silfade Kembunroku was first released on June 8, 2001. Since then, the game was updated episode by episode (each episode is called a Sequence), and currently contains up to Sequence 6. The game’s story is characterized by highly comedic nature. Its humor is marked by the whacky situations and eccentric characters surrounding a rather common young man, Eshutā, and including toilet humor. The usage of RunTime Package is limited, and pictures, extensively using light colors, especially white, are by SmokingWOLF himself.

Silfade Kembunroku is fairly popular among the Japanese freegaming circles, and is one of the most noticeable games created with RPG Tsukūru 2000.

Silfade Gensōtan

 is a non-linear role-playing video game. Like its predecessor, the game is set in a fictional world named Silfade, although apparently in a much older time. The earth’s surface is covered with sea, and seemingly the aerial island is only a place for lives to inhabit. The protagonist was incarnate of Rikurēru (リクレール), a goddess-like figure, by means of gathering a spirit from the Sea of Perception (意識の海), when she witnessed a coming disaster which will wreak havoc upon many lives of the island. Upon incarnation, the protagonist is asked by Rikurēru to prevent the disaster, which should occur after fifteen days, along with a spiritual being called Totem (トーテム).

The game was highly acclaimed at Enterbrain-held Contest Park, in which a reviewer described its game design as "stress-free,"  mainly due to the prevention of lengthy cutscenes.

Gameplay
The game adopts concept of time similar to that of the Dragon Quest games. When the protagonist walks on the field map or in a dungeon, time shown on the left-top corner of the screen gradually progresses. The game has to be solved within fifteen days from the beginning; otherwise the game will end up in a bad ending.

When starting the game, player chooses a Totem out of three. Each Totem has unique ability and influences statuses increasing ratio of the protagonist character.

Silfade Gakuin monogatari

 is a life simulation game made with WOLF RPG Editor. The game is SmokingWOLF's second attempt of shareware.

References

External links
 Author’s website
 Fansite

Doujin video games
RPG Maker games
Indie video games
Video games developed in Japan
Windows games
Windows-only games
Windows-only freeware games
Shareware